The kala pani (lit. black water) represents the proscription of the over reaching seas in Hinduism. According to this prohibition, crossing the seas to foreign lands causes the loss of one's social respectability, as well as the putrefaction of one’s cultural character and posterity.

History 

The offense of crossing the sea is also known as "Samudrolanghana" or "Sagarollanghana". The Dharma Sutra of Baudhayana (II.1.2.2) lists sea voyages as first of the offenses that cause the loss of varna. The Dharma Sutra suggests a person can wipe away this offense in three years by eating little at every fourth meal time; bathing at dawn, noon and dusk; standing during the day; and seated during the night.

The reasons behind the proscription include the inability to carry out the daily rituals of traditional Hindu life and the sin of contact with the characterless, uncivilized mleccha creatures of the foreign lands. An associated notion was that crossing the ocean entailed the end of the reincarnation cycle, as the traveler was cut off from the regenerating waters of the Ganges. Such voyages also meant breaking family and social ties. According to another belief in the pre-modern India, the Kala Pani (sea water) was inhabited by the houglis, bad spirits and monsters.

The mleccha people were spawned by immoral reprobates and blasphemously held religious belief in nāstika, albeit in different forms. They are understood to have rejected the Vedas and have ceased to worship Bhagavan, the divine Vedic God, in favor of concocted false religions and irreligions with contemptible manners of reverence. Their societies are immoral and built on deceit, subjugation, and corruption. Therefore, it was thought that true Hindus should not come under their influence or embrace their beliefs, as they will be just as deserving of contempt as a mleccha.

The 13th century Venetian explorer, Marco Polo, would note in his travelogue, for Malabar:

During the Portuguese Age of exploration, Portuguese sailors noted that Hindus were reluctant to engage in maritime trade due to the kala pani proscription. In the eighteenth century, the banias of North India even considered the crossing of the Indus River at Attock to be prohibited, and underwent purification rituals upon their return. However, not all Hindus adhered to the proscription, so as to gain monetary wealth. For instance, Hindu merchants were present in Burma, Muscat, and other places around Asia and Africa.

British period

Mutinies 

The East India Company recruited several upper-caste soldiers, and adapted its military practices to the requirements of their religious rituals. Consequently, the overseas service, considered polluting to their caste, was not required of them.

During the First Anglo-Burmese War (1824–26), the Bengal Army was ordered to go to Chittagong. Since no bullock carts were available and since sea voyage was a taboo, the Indian soldiers were asked to march to Chittagong by land. The soldiers were concerned about the difficulty involved in a land march, and were also afraid that their superiors might force them to take a sea voyage if the march failed. As a result of these fears, the 47th Regiment refused to march. This resulted in a mutiny on 2 November 1824 at Barrackpore.

The General Service Enlistment Act of 1856 required the new recruits to serve overseas if asked. The serving high-caste sepoys were fearful that this requirement would be eventually extended to them. Thus, the Hindu soldiers viewed the Act as a potential threat to their faith. The resulting discontent was one of the causes of the Indian rebellion of 1857.

Cellular Jail, the British Indian prison on the Andaman and Nicobar Islands was known as Kala Pani: an incarceration in this jail threatened the convicts with the loss of caste and the resulting social exclusion.

Indentured laborer diaspora 

When slavery was abolished in British colonies (such as Mauritius in 1834), the authorities looked for indentured labor to replace the slaves who had been emancipated. The emissaries sent to India for this purpose were astute in attracting so-called "coolies" to the countries such as South Africa, Mauritius, Fiji and the Caribbean that required cheap labor, which were often presented as "promised lands."  But many prospective candidates for the distant colonies expressed their fears of crossing the Kala Pani. So the British often employed a stratagem to dispel the doubts of the indentured: they placed water from the Ganges in large cauldrons on the ships, to ensure the continuity of reincarnation beyond the Kala Pani. The sea voyage was then seen as less fearsome.

The Kala Pani theme features prominently in the Indo-Caribbean history, and has been elaborately discussed in the writings of V. S. Naipaul. Mauritian poet and critic Khal Torabully, who is partly of Indo-Mauritian descent, describes the Kala Pani as a source not only of the dissolution of identity, but also of beauty and reconstruction, leading to what he terms a "coral imaginary." Indo-Guyanese poet Shana Yardan also discussed this cultural issue in her work.

Modern India 

The Tirupati Temple does not allow a priest who has crossed the seas to enter the temple's sanctum sanctorum.

In 2007, the ascension of Sugunendra Tirtha to the Udupi Krishna Temple was opposed by some seers, because he had visited foreign countries, thus committing the offence of saagarolanga (crossing the sea). In 2008, a court verdict formally allowed his ascension. In 2012, both he and his opponent Vishwesha Teertha announced fasts to pressure each other on the issue.

Vishnunarayanan Namboothiri, a noted poet who served as a priest at the Sreevallabha Temple, was not allowed to enter the temple after he returned from an overseas trip to London. The temple authorities, led by the thantri (chief priest), asked him to undergo a thorough cleansing, penance and punaravrodha (reinstallation) before he would be allowed in again. Namboothiri was asked to purify himself by reciting the Gayatri Mantra 1008 times, which he refused to do. The Rashtriya Swayamsevak Sangh supported him, calling the taboo an "outdated ritual". The Travancore Devaswom Board also supported him, and fired two of its officials for refusing to support his reinstatement. After the board served the thantri a show-cause notice, Namboothiri was allowed back after purification by sprinkling of holy water (theertham).

References

External links
 Lomarsh Roopnarine, The Long Journey to Today: East Indians in Guyana.  Guyana Chronicle Online
 Crossing of Kala Pani, from the exhibition ORIGINS: Creative Tracks of Indian Diaspora

Cultural history of India
Mauritian culture
Indian diaspora
Taboo
Hindu culture